Ózdi Kézilabda Club  is a Hungarian handball club from Ózd, that plays in the Nemzeti Bajnokság I/B, the second level championship in Hungary.

Naming history
1993–2015: Ózdi KC
2015–present: ÓAM-Ózdi KC

Kits

Current squad
Squad for the 2022–23 season

Transfers
Transfers for the 2021–22 season

Joining 

  Péter Carlos Moscoso (GK) from  SBS-Eger
  András Gál (CB) from  Békési FKC
  Zsigmond Vad (LP) from  Hatvani KSZSE
  Péter Kovács (RW) from  Hatvani KSZSE
  Balázs Veres (CB) from  Hatvani KSZSE
  Attila Ménfői (RW) from  Balassagyarmati Kábel SE

Leaving 
  Dominik Nagy (GK) to  Mezőkövesdi KC
  Patrik Tóth (CB) to  Ceglédi KKSE
  Norbert Hangyel
  Krisztián Benák
  Gergő Csaba
  Ádám Bécsi
  Attila Péter
  Gergely Zsigmond

Honours

Individual awards

Domestic
Nemzeti Bajnokság I Top Scorer

Recent seasons
Seasons in Nemzeti Bajnokság I: 6
Seasons in Nemzeti Bajnokság I/B: 18

Former club members

Notable former players

 László Fekete
 Tamás Frey
 Csaba Kocsis
 Áron Lezák 
 István Marosi 
 József Padla 
 Serghei Krasnii
 Costică Buceschi (1999–2000)
 Goran Đukić
 Maroš Čorej
 Jan Kucera 
 Pavol Jano

References

External links
 Official website
 

Hungarian handball clubs
Sport in Borsod-Abaúj-Zemplén County